Erkkie-Harris Wells is an American trichologist and the founder of Miyohara International Trichology Clinic in Costa Mesa, California.

Erkkie-Harris Wells was a director of Miyohara International in London. She subsequently moved to California where she heads Miyohara International. As a part of her 3 decade career in the hair loss and beauty industry, she has worked for companies like Revlon, Nexxus, Joico, Sebastian and Redken, enabling them to target their products at a multi-ethnic group of consumers. Wells was the first trichologist to have been a part of the International Society of Hair Restoration Surgery.

Career
Wells received her education from the Institute of Biosthetics (England and France), Santa Monica City College, and Marinello Beauty College. After completing her academics, she started working as a trichologist to diagnose and treat hair and scalp disorders to treat those struggling with hair loss. 

She is a former Adjunct Member of the ISHRS. Her career included work as a consultant for the London Hairdresser Training Board, a governing body that regulates the cosmetology training in the UK. While in England, her work was mostly referral based in collaboration with hair replacement clinics and surgeons on Harley Street.

References

External links

Trichology